Huddersfield Town's 1955–56 campaign saw Town relegated from Division 1. They finished in 21st position with 35 points, the same as 20th placed Aston Villa, who survived due to a superior goal average. The season was a cramped affair in the league standings, with difference in points between 2nd placed Blackpool and bottom placed Sheffield United, being just 16 points.

Squad at the start of the season

Review
Following the previous season's failure to improve on the season before's 3rd-placed finish, some were wondering what Town would conjure up under Andy Beattie. The start of the season was dreadful for Town, with many losses sending Town into a downward spiral to the bottom of Division 1. Even the signing of Aston Villa striker Dave Hickson didn't halt the slide to Division 2. A run of 7 defeats in a row, including a 5–2 defeat at Everton, followed immediately by a 6–2 defeat to Newcastle United at Leeds Road didn't help things much.

February to April saw Town mount a recovery mainly through the goals of Jimmy Glazzard, Dave Hickson and Vic Metcalfe. Town still had a chance of survival with 4 matches to go, although they realistically had to win all their last 4 games against West Bromwich Albion, Charlton Athletic, Tottenham Hotspur and Charlton Athletic. They did manage to achieve this, but an inferior goal average meant that Town went down, while Aston Villa survived.

Squad at the end of the season

Results

Division One

FA Cup

Appearances and goals

Huddersfield Town A.F.C. seasons
Huddersfield Town